The 1884 New York Gothams season was the second season of that baseball franchise, eventually known as the San Francisco Giants. The team finished in fourth place, 22 games behind the pennant-winning Providence Grays.

Regular season

Season standings

Record vs. opponents

Roster

Player stats

Batting

Starters by position 
Note: Pos = Position; G = Games played; AB = At bats; H = Hits; Avg. = Batting average; HR = Home runs; RBI = Runs batted in

Other batters 
Note: G = Games played; AB = At bats; H = Hits; Avg. = Batting average; HR = Home runs; RBI = Runs batted in

Pitching

Starting pitchers 
Note: G = Games pitched; IP = Innings pitched; W = Wins; L = Losses; ERA = Earned run average; SO = Strikeouts

Other pitchers 
Note: G = Games pitched; IP = Innings pitched; W = Wins; L = Losses; ERA = Earned run average; SO = Strikeouts

References 
1884 New York Gothams season at Baseball Reference

San Francisco Giants seasons
New York Gothams season
New York Goth
19th century in Manhattan
Washington Heights, Manhattan